Divarilima pellucida is a species of saltwater clam, a marine bivalve mollusc in the family Limidae.  Divarilima pellucida has only been found in the waters of New Zealand.

References

Sources
Books

 

Web resources

 

Limidae
Bivalves of New Zealand